A Night Full of Rain (literal English translation: The end of the world in our usual bed on a night full of rain) is a 1978 Italian American film directed by Lina Wertmüller and stars Candice Bergen and Giancarlo Giannini.

Lina Wertmüller was nominated as best director at the 28th Berlin International Film Festival in 1978.

The plot concerns a romantic and heart-breaking relationship between a chauvinist Italian journalist and a feminist American photographer.

The film was shot in San Francisco and Rome and was the director's first film with original dialogue in the English language.

Plot
Two good looking lads meet while the girl is in a situation in some small Italian village. As they escape in an abandoned cloister, the man try to seduce the lady with manipulation techniques. As he makes fun of her, she refuses herself to him. and almost raping her. Randomly meeting later in San Francisco, the guy hits again on her and manage to seduce her to get married with a child. A troubled marriage for a troubled pair.

Cast
 Giancarlo Giannini as Paolo
 Candice Bergen as Lizzy
 Michael Tucker as Friend
 Mario Scarpetta as Friend
 Lucio Amelio as Friend
 Massimo Wertmüller as Friend
 Anny Papa as Friend
 Anne Byrne Hoffman as Friend
 Flora Carabella as Friend
 Anita Paltrinieri as Friend
 Giuliana Carnescecchi as Friend
 Alice Colombo Oxman as Friend
 Jill Eikenberry
 Paola Ojetti
 Enzo Vitale
 Paola Silvia Rotunno
 John West Buchanan
 Lilli Carati (as Ileana Caravati)
 Alison Tucker

References

External links
 

1978 films
1978 drama films
English-language Italian films
Italian drama films
Films about journalists
Films directed by Lina Wertmüller
Warner Bros. films
American drama films
Films set in Rome
Films shot in Rome
1970s English-language films
1970s American films
1970s Italian films